Auburn Mall is a regional shopping mall located in Auburn, Alabama, United States, and combines traditional mall shopping with village streetscape shopping. The two main department stores, Belk and Dillard's, are supplemented by more than 50 specialty stores. These stores include Ann Taylor Loft, JoS. A. Bank, Talbots, Chico's, and Hibbett Sports.

History

Auburn Mall was originally built in 1973 by Colonial Properties Trust as "Village Mall", with two anchor stores initially: Sears at the western end and Gayfers at the eastern end. Later  the mall was expanded to include a third anchor  and subsequently a fourth. In 1998 the mall's name changed to Colonial Mall Auburn-Opelika. In 2004, Auburn Mall underwent a major renovation and expansion. The expansion included new JCPenney and Dillard's buildings, Belk relocating to the market, and adding a streetscape to the front of the mall. The streetscape  included retailers such as Ann Taylor Loft, Chico's, Coldwater Creek, Jos. A Bank, Lane Bryant and Talbots. The expansion also added 250+ jobs to the market. During the renovation Colonial made the decision to update the mall's name to Colonial University Village.

Since that time, Colonial University Village, along with five other Colonial properties, was purchased as part of a joint venture by Marelda Retail Development, LLC. In 2007 Jones Lang LaSalle became management and leasing contractor of Colonial University Village and the other properties. In 2014, the name of the mall was changed from Village Mall to Auburn Mall. Sears closed the store in December 2012. Stein Mart announced to take over the former Sears space in March 2017. On March 17, 2017, JCPenney announced that it would be closing as part of a plan to close 138 stores nationwide. The store closed its doors on July 31, 2017. On April 14, 2020, it was announced that the former JCPenney would be converted into a mall entrance and smaller stores. On August 12, 2020, it was announced that Stein Mart would be closing all stores, including the one at Auburn Mall which will leave Belk and Dillard's as the only anchors stores.

Tenants
 Claire's
 Sunglass Hut
 American Eagle Outfitters
 The Mint Julep Boutique
 Rainbow Shops
 Belk
 Dillard's
 iFix
 T-Mobile
 ABC Toys 
 The Maker and Merchant
 Bath & Body Works
 Eyemart Express
 Zale Corporation 
 Applebee's
 Barberitos
 Chick-fil-A
 Great American Cookies
 Krispy Kreme
 Foot Locker
 Hibbett Sports

Notes

References
PRNewsWire.com Article
Web2Journal.com Article

Buildings and structures in Auburn, Alabama
Shopping malls established in 1973
Shopping malls in Alabama
Tourist attractions in Lee County, Alabama
Hull Property Group